Rhynchocypris dementjevi is an Asian species of small freshwater cyprinid fish.

References

Rhynchocypris
Fish described in 1954